Harry Corwin Nixon (April 1, 1891 – October 22, 1961) was a Canadian politician and briefly the 13th premier of Ontario in 1943. He is both the longest-serving member in the history of the Ontario legislature and the shortest-serving premier of Ontario.

Life and career
Nixon was born on a farm near St. George, Ontario, the son of a dairy farmer, Henry Nixon, and studied at the University of Toronto's Ontario Agricultural College (then affiliated with the university).

He was first elected to the Legislative Assembly of Ontario in 1919 as a candidate of the United Farmers of Ontario. He served as a Cabinet minister in the government of Premier Ernest C. Drury as Provincial Secretary and Registrar. Following the defeat of the UFO-Labour government in the 1923 election, Nixon sat as a Progressive Member of the Legislative Assembly (MLA), and became the leader of the small Progressive bloc (as most UFOers now called themselves) after the 1929 election.

Mitchell Hepburn, a farmer and former UFO organizer, became leader of the Ontario Liberal Party, and Nixon led his Progressive remnant into an alliance with Hepburn's party. In the 1934 election, Nixon and his followers ran as Liberal-Progressives, helping bring the Hepburn to power. He ran and was elected as a Liberal in the 1937 election. 

Nixon resumed his former Cabinet position of Provincial Secretary and Registrar in the Hepburn cabinet and was the senior minister in the government. During World War II, Hepburn clashed with William Lyon Mackenzie King, the Liberal Prime Minister of Canada, arguing that King was not sufficiently prosecuting the war effort, in particular by not introducing conscription (see Conscription Crisis of 1944). Hepburn openly supported King's rival, Conservative leader Arthur Meighen in a 1942 York South by-election, and seemed to be calling for the defeat of King. This was too much for many Ontario Liberals, who were either King loyalists or feared a rift between the federal and provincial parties. Hepburn was forced to resign on October 21, 1942.

Nixon was widely seen as the "heir apparent," and had earlier turned down Hepburn's offer to recommend that Nixon be appointed Premier, as Nixon insisted the leadership should be the choice of the party, not of Hepburn. However, Hepburn, while resigning as Premier, insisted on remaining as party leader, and simply appointed his ally, Gordon Daniel Conant as the new Premier of Ontario on October 21, 1942. Nixon resigned from the cabinet on October 22, 1942 in opposition to Hepburn's refusal to allow a leadership convention to elect a new leader. Conant was forced to resign after only six months due to serious divisions in the party, and a leadership convention was called. Nixon was chosen as Liberal leader, and thus appointed Premier in May 1943, but his government was unable to win the election held three months later, and the Liberals were reduced to third place behind George Drew's Progressive Conservatives and Ted Jolliffe's Co-operative Commonwealth Federation. Nixon resigned as Liberal leader on December 10, 1944 and nominated Hepburn as the party's House Leader (interim leader). Hepburn led to party into the 1945 provincial election.

Harry Nixon remained a Liberal Member of Provincial Parliament (MPP)1 until his death in 1961. His son, Robert Nixon succeed him as MPP, and later became leader of the Liberal Party but never Premier. He served as Treasurer in the Cabinet of David Peterson from 1985–1990. Harry Nixon's granddaughter (and Robert Nixon's daughter) Jane Stewart served as a Cabinet minister in the federal Liberal government of Jean Chrétien.

See also

 Mitchell Hepburn#Resignation

Notes
1 In 1938, Members of the Ontario Legislative Assembly (MLAs) passed a motion to adopt the title "Members of Provincial Parliament" (MPP).

References

External links 
 
 History of the county of Brant, FD Reville (1920) 
 Plaque of Harry Nixon

1891 births
1961 deaths
Ontario Liberal Party MPPs
Premiers of Ontario
University of Toronto alumni
Leaders of the Ontario Liberal Party
Members of the United Church of Canada
United Farmers of Ontario MLAs
Provincial Secretaries of Ontario
Leaders of the United Farmers of Ontario/Progressives
Ontario Agricultural College alumni
People from the County of Brant